Kusu Island is one of the Southern Islands in Singapore, located about  to the south of the main island of Singapore and below the Singapore Straits.  "Kusu" means "Tortoise Island" or "Turtle Island" in Hokkien; the island is also known as Peak Island or Pulau Tembakul in Malay. 

During the lunar ninth month of every year, the Kusu Island pilgrimage attracts thousands of devotees who visit and worship at the Da Bo Gong (Tua Pek Kong) Temple. Besides the Chinese temple, the island is also home to three Malay shrines (Keramat).

Mythology
The legend behind the island says that a magical tortoise turned itself into an island to save two shipwrecked sailors, one a Malay and the other a Chinese.

Facilities 
At the top of the rugged hillock on Kusu Island stood three keramats (or sacred shrines of Malay holy figures) to commemorate a pious man (Syed Abdul Rahman), his mother (Nenek Ghalib) and his sister (Puteri Fatimah), all of whom once lived in the 19th century. Many devotees climbed the 152 steps leading up to the keramats to pray for wealth, good marriage, good health and harmony. The shrines were also popular with childless couples who would pray for children. On April 17, 2022, the keramats were badly damaged in a fire.

Also located on Kusu island is the popular Chinese temple dedicated to both Da Bo Gong (大伯公), or Tua Pek Kong (Grand Uncle), also known as Fude Zhengshen (福德正神) and Na Tuk Kong (Dato Keramat or "拿督公"). Built in 1923 by a wealthy businessman, the temple houses two main Chinese Deities, Da Bo Gong and Guan Yin ("观音", or Goddess of Mercy). The former is highly regarded as having the power to confer prosperity, cure diseases, calm the sea and avert danger, while Guan Yin is known as the "Bestower of Sons".

It is popular for its lagoons, pristine beaches and general tranquil settings.  Visits are often made by occasional ferry trips from the nearby Marina South Pier (formerly from Clifford Pier) to see the famous wishing well and the Tortoise Sanctuary. A stand-alone open-air hawker centre is located in the middle of the island but it is only open and running during certain periods of the year, such as during festivals or pilgrimages to the keramats or the temple. No overnight stays are permitted on the island.

References

 Chia, Jack Meng-Tat. "Managing The Tortoise Island: Tua Pek Kong Temple, Pilgrimage, and Social Change in Pulau Kusu, 1965-2007." New Zealand Journal of Asian Studies 11, 2 (December 2009): 72-95.
 Lu, Caixia. "The Kusu Pilgrimage: An Enduring Myth." International Institute for Asian Studies Newsletter 59 (Spring 2012): 50-51.

News articles

External links

 Satellite image of Peak Island - Google Maps
Info for visitors on wildsingapore
Kusu Island Coral Reef Survey Data on Coral Reefs of Singapore

Islands of Singapore
Southern Islands